Znamya-Udmurtiya is a bandy club in Votkinsk, Russia. The club was founded in 1931 and has earlier been playing in the Super League, the top-tier of Russian bandy. It is now playing in the second tier Supreme League. The home games are played at Stadium Znamya in Votkinsk. The club colours are white and red, likely inspired by the coat of arms of Udmurtia.

Team picture:

Jersey depiction:

External links
Another page at Vkontakte

References

Bandy clubs in Russia
Bandy clubs in the Soviet Union
Sport in Udmurtia
Bandy clubs established in 1931
1931 establishments in Russia